Casale sul Sile is a comune with c. 13,000 inhabitants in the province of Treviso in the Veneto, north-eastern Italy. Its name (translated as 'farmhouse on the Sile') comes from Sile, the river that runs through it.

References

Cities and towns in Veneto